Pseudicius wesolowskae is a jumping spider species in the genus Pseudicius.

Distribution
Pseudicius wesolowskae is found in China.

Taxonomy
Pseudicius wesolowskae  was first identified in 2001. The species is named in honour of Wanda Wesołowska.

References

Salticidae
Spiders described in 2001
Spiders of China